Noémi Tóth (born 7 June 1976 in Szentes, Hungary) is a female water polo defender from Italy, who won the gold medal with the Women's National Team at the 2004 Summer Olympics in Athens, Greece.

See also
 Italy women's Olympic water polo team records and statistics
 List of Olympic champions in women's water polo
 List of Olympic medalists in water polo (women)
 List of world champions in women's water polo
 List of World Aquatics Championships medalists in water polo

References

External links
 

1976 births
Living people
People from Szentes
Hungarian expatriate sportspeople in Italy
Naturalised citizens of Italy
Hungarian female water polo players
Italian female water polo players
Water polo centre backs
Water polo players at the 2004 Summer Olympics
Medalists at the 2004 Summer Olympics
Olympic gold medalists for Italy in water polo
World Aquatics Championships medalists in water polo
Sportspeople from Csongrád-Csanád County